The Justice Party is a political party in the United States. It was organized in November 2011 by a group of political activists including former mayor of Salt Lake City Rocky Anderson as an alternative to what they saw as a duopoly of the two major political parties. One of the major goals of the Justice Party is removing corporate domination and other concentrated wealth from politics. In 2012, the Justice Party nominated Rocky Anderson for president and Luis J. Rodriguez for vice president. The Justice Party endorsed Bernie Sanders during the primary election in 2016.

History 

In December 2011 the Justice Party became a qualified party in Mississippi, the first state to recognize the party. From a small beginning, 30 persons at the launching event with no TV crew covering it, the Justice Party was able to put its founder Rocky Anderson on the ballot in 15 states and secure official write-in status in 25 additional states. It was the fifth largest third party in terms of presidential ballot access in the 2012 presidential election. On October 23, 2012, Anderson faced off with other third-party candidates Gary Johnson of the Libertarian Party, Jill Stein of the Green Party and Virgil Goode of the Constitution Party for a debate moderated by former CNN talk-show host Larry King. The candidates met again to debate on November 5, 2012, this time moderated by Ralph Nader. Rocky Anderson participated in three presidential debates on programs entitled "Expand the Debates" on the nationally televised Democracy Now!

The Justice Party released a statement endorsing Bernie Sanders for the 2016 Democratic nomination rather than nominating its own candidate. The party did not run candidates later during the 2016 presidential election or 2020 presidential election, because the party wanted to avoid contributing to a spoiler effect. In 2021, the Justice Party announced that it "plans to grow into a diverse majority political party". Founder Rocky Anderson said the party intended to replace either the Republican Party or the Democratic Party.

Ideology and positions 
The Justice Party was created with the motto "economic, environmental, and social justice for all". The party was designed with the intention of shifting government back to a focus on the Constitution of the United States of America by removing the corrupting influence of money in politics.

Economic justice 
The Justice Party supports fundamental campaign finance reform. The Justice Party supports a constitutional amendment to abolish corporate personhood through Move to Amend. The party is in favor of a progressive tax structure and wants to end tax cuts for the wealthy. The party supports green jobs and infrastructure programs. The Justice Party wants to provide tax relief for working people and to bolster Social Security, by reducing the percentage of compensation taxed for Social Security and Medicare, but eliminating the cap on payroll taxes. The party is pro-immigration reform, pro-breaking up too-large-to-fail banks, pro-reinstating Glass–Steagall, pro-government funded higher education and against subsidies to oil and gas companies. The party also supports a pay-as-you-go, balanced budget approach.

Environmental justice 
The Justice Party is for aggressive climate protection. It is against the Keystone Pipeline and advocates transition from fossil fuels to renewable energy. The Justice Party supports a ban on mountaintop removal mining and wants to strengthen the Environmental Protection Agency.

Social justice 
The Justice Party supports a universal single payer health insurance system, an Equal Rights Amendment, marriage equality, ending wars of aggression, closing many military bases, reducing the budget, immigration reform, repealing the Patriot Act, protecting and rewarding whistleblowers and ending the War on Drugs. The party also advocated the prosecution of individuals whose illegal conduct led to the 2008 financial crisis.

2012 presidential election results

Candidates for other offices

Presidential tickets

See also 
 John B. Anderson

References 

 General
 Davis, Glenn  "Justice Party Believes It Can Change American Politics through Social Movement"

External links

Rocky Anderson
Justice Party of New York

2011 establishments in the United States
Political parties established in 2011
Political parties in the United States
Progressive parties in the United States
Social democratic parties in the United States
Social justice organizations